The discography of Australian Christian rock band Newsboys consists of 20 studio albums, 2 remix albums, 17 compilations, 2 live albums, 1 demo, 102 singles, 10 extended plays 22 music videos, and some official live recordings.

Studio albums

Remix albums

Compilation albums

Live albums

Extended plays
 Entertaining Angels (1998)
 It Is You EP (2002)
 8 Great Hits (2003)
 Go EP (2006)
 Top Five (2006)
 Something Beautiful (2009)
 Born Again Preview EP (2010)
 Discover: 6 Essential Songs (2010)
 Christmas! A Newsboys Holiday (2010) – US Christian peak: No. 11
 Love Riot Preview EP (2016)
 United:Live (EP) (2020)

Live bootlegs
Newsboys hired "Disc Live" to record four shows on their Adoration tour. 2000 copies of each were produced as two disc sets. They were sold after the shows, and on the Disc Live website. The shows were:
 3.28 Minot, 2004 [Disc Live]
 3.27 Minneapolis, 2004 [Disc Live]
 3.26 Chicago, 2004 [Disc Live]
 3.25 Milwaukee, 2004 [Disc Live]

Newsboys recorded multiple dates on the "Join the Tribe" Tour, which were available for download on the Newsboys website.

Singles

1980s
<small>Note: all CCM Magazine chart information is available in the book Hot Hits CHR 1978-1997 (1997) by Jeffrey Lee Brothers</small>

1990s

2000s

2010s

2020s

Other charted songs

No. 1 singles
A listing of the Newsboys' radio No. 1 singles, according to their fact sheet posted on their label's website, Inpop Records as well as CCM Magazine, Radio & Records, and Billboard magazine. While most of the hit singles are always counted towards their overall No. 1 hits tally, the inclusion of "One Heart" is in dispute as being an actual No. 1 (Inpop Records lists it as their first No. 1 single, while CCM lists it as having only peaked at No. 2, making "I'm Not Ashamed" arguably their first No. 1). Also, some tallies of their No. 1 hits only include the more popular current CHR and AC formats, leaving out "Cup O' Tea" and "Breathe", which were No. 1 hits on the Christian Rock chart only, and "Presence (My Heart's Desire)" and "Wherever We Go", which both topped the Christian CHR Recurrent chart after falling below No. 20 after 20 weeks on the Christian CHR chart.

Videography

Feature-length films

Music videos

Lyric videos

Appearances on compilation albums

Various artists albums
{| class="wikitable sortable"
|-
!Year
!Compilation
!Label
!Song(s) Included
!Original AlbumAppearance
|-
|1991
|Ultimate Rock
|214Records
|"In the End"
|Hell Is for Wimps
|-
|1993
|Romantic Rock Vol. 4(Germany only)
|Pila Music
|"Where You Belong/Turn Your Eyes Upon Jesus"
|Not Ashamed
|-
|rowspan="9"|1995
|rowspan="4"|Newsboys: The Going Public Tour(Newsboys, Audio Adrenaline, Tony Vincent)
|rowspan="4"|Star Song Records
|"Real Good Thing"
|rowspan="9"|Going Public
|-
|"Shine"
|-
|"Truth and Consequences"
|-
|"Elle G."
|-
|Romantic Rock Vol. 6(Germany only)
|Pila Music
|"Let It Rain"
|-
|Thru the Roof
|rowspan="2"|Interlinc.
|rowspan="2"|"Truth and Consequences"
|-
|Right from Wrong
|-
|WOW 1996
|Sparrow Records /EMI
|"Shine"
|-
|A Little on the CD Side: Volume 15
|Musician Magazine
|"Elle G."
|-
|rowspan="6"|1996
|Hear & Beyond
|Star Song Records
|"Reality"
|rowspan="2"|Take Me to Your Leader
|-
|CD Aircheck Vol. 21: Reinvention
|FMQB
|"Take Me to Your Leader"
|-
|Dove Awards Collection: 27th Dove Awards, 1996
|Brentwood Music
|rowspan="2"|"Shine"
|rowspan="2"|Going Public
|-
|More Than Gold: A Christian Music Tribute
|Interlinc.
|-
|Seltzer
|Forefront Records
|"God Is Not a Secret"
|rowspan="6"|Take Me to Your Leader
|-
|WOW 1997
|Sparrow Records /EMI
|"Take Me to Your Leader"
|-
|rowspan="4"|1997
|Pulz: 15 Rock Alternatives(Europe only)
|Forefront Records /Alliance Music
|"God Is Not a Secret"
|-
|WWJD
|Forefront Records
|"Breathe"
|-
|WOW 1998
|Sparrow Records /EMI
|"Reality"
|-
|High Fidelity Reference-CD No. 25
|High Fidelity Magazine
|"Let It Go"
|-
|rowspan="8"|1998
|rowspan="4"|The Simply Xcellent New Music Sampler
|rowspan="4"|EMI /Chordant, Alliance Music
|sneak peek:
|rowspan="4"|Entertaining Angels EP
|-
|"Entertaining Angels"
|-
|"Shine 2000"
|-
|plus a personal message
|-
|Seltzer 2
|rowspan="2"|Forefront Records
|"Lost the Plot"
|Take Me to Your Leader
|-
|Life on the Edge
|"Entertaining Angels"
|Step Up to the Microphone
|-
|Songs 4 Life: Lift Your Spirit
|WEA, Time Life
|"I'm Not Ashamed"
|Not Ashamed
|-
|WOW 1999
|Sparrow Records /EMI
|"Entertaining Angels"
|rowspan="2"|Step Up to the Microphone
|-
|rowspan="8"|1999
|rowspan="2"|See You at the Pole: We Bow Down
|rowspan="2"|unknown
|"Tuning In"
|-
|Newsboys spot
|(exclusive)
|-
|WOW The 90s
|Provident Label Group
|"Shine"
|Going Public
|-
|Vestal & Friends(Vestal Goodman and Various Artists)
|Pamplin Records
|"Great Is Thy Faithfulness"(with Vestal Goodman)
|(exclusive)
|-
|Power Jams
|Forefront Records
|"Shine" (Sequential Mix)
|remixed version of song fromGoing Public
|-
|Listen Louder
|Sparrow Records
|"Hallelujah" (Illumination Remix)
|remixed version of song fromStep Up to the Microphone
|-
|WOW 2000
|Sparrow Records /EMI
|"Love Liberty Disco"
|rowspan="3"|Love Liberty Disco
|-
|SuperSaturday
|unknown
|Love Liberty Disco album sneak peek
|-
|rowspan="8"|2000
|Metamorphosis: Mission Adventures - Youth with a Mission
|unknown
|"Everyone's Someone"
|-
|The Joyriders (Soundtrack)
|Gotee Records
|"Entertaining Angels"
|Step Up to the Microphone
|-
|Pass It On: Leaving a Legacy for a Lifetime
|Focus on the Family /Chordant
|"I'm Not Ashamed"
|Not Ashamed
|-
|50 Years of the Happy Goodmans(The Happy Goodmans)
|Spring House /Spring Hill /Chordant
|"I Surrender All" (Live)
|live version of song fromLove Liberty Disco
|-
|WOW Gold
|Brentwood
|"I'm Not Ashamed"
|Not Ashamed
|-
|rowspan="2"|Stadium Jam
|rowspan="2"|Pamplin
|"Shine" (Live)
|live version of song fromGoing Public
|-
|"Entertaining Angels" (Live)
|live version of song fromStep Up to the Microphone
|-
|WOW Hits 2001
|Sparrow /EMI
|"Beautiful Sound"
|Love Liberty Disco
|-
|rowspan="4"|2001
|Extreme Days (Soundtrack)
|Forefront Records
|"Entertaining Angels"
|Step Up to the Microphone
|-
|Festival Con Dios
|Inpop Records
|"God Is Not a Secret"(feat. TobyMac)
|rowspan="2"|Shine: The Hits
|-
|WOW Hits 2002
|rowspan="2"|Sparrow
|"Joy"
|-
|Hear It First: New Music Sampler 2002
|sneak peek at the yet-to-be-released new album from Newsboys
|rowspan="7"|Thrive
|-
|rowspan="9"|2002
|Cross Rhythms Experience 19(Europe only)
|Cross Rhythms
|"It Is You"
|-
|rowspan="2"|Gesucht & gefunden(Germany only promo)
|rowspan="2"|Gerth Music
|"Cornelius" (sample)
|-
|"Thrive" (sample)
|-
|Cross Rhythms Experience 20(Europe only)
|Cross Rhythms
|rowspan="2"|"Giving It Over"
|-
|Sonic Fuel: New Music Sampler
|Chordant /Walmart
|-
|Turn It Up: Sample the Best in Christian Pop
|Chordant /LifeWay
|"Rescue"
|-
|Jonah: A VeggieTales Movie (Soundtrack)
|Big Idea Records /Chordant
|"In the Belly of the Whale"
|(exclusive)
|-
|WOW Hits 2003
|Chordant
|"It Is You"
|Thrive
|-
|Hear It First: New Music Sampler 2003
|Sparrow
|"Adoration"(Newsboys album sneak peek)
|Adoration: The Worship Album
|-
|rowspan="3"|2003
|X 2003
|Chordant
|"John Woo"
|rowspan="2"|Thrive
|-
|Festival Con Dios Volume III
|Inpop
|"Cornelius"
|-
|WOW Hits 2004
|rowspan="3"|EMI
|"He Reigns"
|rowspan="2"|Adoration: The Worship Album
|-
|rowspan="5"|2004
|rowspan="2"|Worship Together: Here I Am to Worship - 25 Worship Favorites
|"You Are My King (Amazing Love)"
|-
|"It Is You"
|Thrive
|-
|Veggie Rocks!
|Forefront /EMI
|"In the Belly of the Whale"
|Jonah: A VeggieTales Movie (Soundtrack)
|-
|Dove Hits 2004
|Word /WBR
|"He Reigns"
|rowspan="4"|Adoration: The Worship Album
|-
|WOW Hits 2005
|Sparrow /Chordant
|"You Are My King (Amazing Love)"
|-
|rowspan="7"|2005
|Worship Together: Here I Am to Worship 2 - 25 Worship Favorites
|EMI
|rowspan="2"|"He Reigns"
|-
|America's Choice 30: The Worship Songs Everyone Is Singing
|Cool Springs
|-
|rowspan="2"|Worship Together Platinum (CD/DVD)
|rowspan="2"|EMI /Time Life
|"It Is You"
|Thrive
|-
|"He Reigns" (video)
|rowspan="2"|Adoration: The Worship Album
|-
|WOW#1s
|Provident /EMI
|"He Reigns"
|-
|Building One World: The XX. World Youth Day Compilation(Germany only)
|J-Star
|"God of Nations"
|rowspan="2"|Devotion
|-
|WOW Hits 2006
|Sparrow /Chordant
|"Presence (My Heart's Desire)"
|-
|rowspan="9"|2006
|rowspan="2"|Smash-Ups
|rowspan="2"|Sparrow
|"Colored People/Entertaining Angels"mash-up of "Entertaining Angels" with dc Talk's "Colored People"
|rowspan="2"|(exclusive)
|-
|"Shine/Tonight"mash-up
|-
|WOW Worship Aqua
|Provident
|"He Reigns"
|Adoration: The Worship Album
|-
|rowspan="2"|The Ultimate Collection: Worship
|rowspan="2"|Sparrow
|"He Reigns"
|rowspan="2"|Adoration: The Worship Album
|-
|"You Are My King (Amazing Love)"
|-
|I Am Free: Worship Collection
|Inpop
|rowspan="2"|"I Am Free"(Studio Version)
|rowspan="4"|GO
|-
|WOW Hits 2007
|Sparrow /Chordant
|-
|X 2007
|BEC /EMI
|"Go"
|-
|iWorship Platinum
|Integrity /Sony /Columbia
|"I Am Free"(Studio Version)
|-
|rowspan="3"|2007
|WOW Hymns
|Word /EMI /Provident
|"In Christ Alone"
|rowspan="2"|Adoration: The Worship Album
|-
|The Wonderful Cross
|Sparrow
|"You Are My King (Amazing Love)"
|-
|WOW Hits 2008
|EMI
|"Something Beautiful"
|GO
|-
|rowspan="4"|2008
|rowspan="2"|Everlasting God: 25 Modern Worship Favorites
|rowspan="2"|Sparrow
|"You Are My King (Amazing Love)"
|rowspan="2"|Adoration: The Worship Album
|-
|"He Reigns"
|-
|WOW Hits 1
|rowspan="2"|EMI
|"In Wonder"
|GO
|-
|WOW Essentials
|rowspan="2"|"He Reigns"
|rowspan="2"|Adoration: The Worship Album
|-
|rowspan="2"|2009
|Walk & Worship
|Star Song
|-
|WOW Hits 2010
|rowspan="2"|Word Entertainment
|"In the Hands of God"
|In the Hands of God
|-
|rowspan="5"|2010
|WOW Worship: Purple
|"I Am Free"
|GO
|-
|''Boomin
|rowspan="3"|Star Song
|"Shine" (Remix)
|Shine: The Hits|-
|Christian Music's Best Pop|"Something Beautiful"
|GO|-
|Christian Music's Best Worship|"Blessed Be Your Name"
|Devotion|-
|WOW Hits 2011|Word Entertainment
|"Born Again"
|Born Again|-
|rowspan="4"|2011
|rowspan="2"|From the Inside Out|rowspan="2"|Sparrow
|"In Christ Alone"
|Adoration: The Worship Album|-
|"Blessed Be Your Name"
|Devotion|-
|WOW Christmas|Word Entertainment
|"Jingle Bell Rock"
|Christmas! A Newsboys Holiday|-
|Christian Workout Playlist|rowspan="3"|Star Song
|"I Am Free"
|GO|-
|rowspan="3"|2012
|Seasons of Joy|"Joy"
|Shine: The Hits|-
|Mighty to Save|"In Christ Alone"
|Adoration: The Worship Album|-
|WOW Hits 2013|EMI
|"God's Not Dead (Like a Lion)"
|God's Not Dead|-
|rowspan="4"|2013
|Jesus, Firm Foundation: Hymns of Worship|Provident Label Group
|"Jesus Paid It All"
|Hallelujah for the Cross|-
|WOW Hits 2014|EMI
|"Live with Abandon"
|rowspan="2"|Restart|-
|My Hope: Songs Inspired by the Message and Mission of Billy Graham|Capitol
|"We Believe"
|-
|WOW Christmas (2013)|EMI
|"All I Want for Christmas Is You"
|Christmas! A Newsboys Holiday|-
|rowspan="3"|2014
|rowspan="2"|God's Not Dead: The Motion Picture Soundtrack|rowspan="2"|Inpop
|"God's Not Dead (Like a Lion)" (Movie Version)
|rowspan="2"|God's Not Dead|-
|"The King Is Coming"
|-
|WOW Hits 2015|EMI
|"We Believe"
|Restart|-
|rowspan="3"|2016
|rowspan="2"|God's Not Dead 2: Motion Picture Soundtrack|rowspan="2"|Fair Trade Services
|"God's Not Dead (Like A Lion)"
|God's Not Dead|-
|"Guilty"
|Love Riot|-
|WOW Hits 2017|Capitol CMG
|"Guilty"
|Love Riot|-
|TBA
|Teenage Mutant Ninja Turtles: Convicts from Dimension X|Lionsgate Records
|"Guilty"
|Love Riot|}

Newsboys compilation albums

In popular media

Video games
Newsboys has a total of nine songs featured in the Dance Praise series:

Notes

A  Released as a promotional music video only.
B  "Good Stuff"/"I Surrender All" released as a double A-side single with "Good Stuff" geared towards CHR/Rock formats, and "I Surrender All" for AC format.
C  "Adoration" was possibly not released a radio single, but received enough airplay to chart during the Christmas season.
D  "Isaiah" was originally released as an iTunes Exclusive bonus track for Devotion. The song has since been removed as a bonus track from the album on iTunes and is now available as a single-only release.
E  "Thrive" (Is That James Dancing? Mix) charted on the Billboard'' Dance Singles Sales chart due to its inclusion as the B-side on the Newsboys' "He Reigns" single.
F  In addition to peaking at No. 4 on the Hot Christian Songs chart, He Reigns" also peaked at No. 36 on the Christian Digital Song Sales chart.
G  "Crazy" did not enter the Hot Christian Songs chart, but peaked at number 27 on the Christian Hot AC/CHR chart.

References 

Discographies of Australian artists
Pop music group discographies
Rock music group discographies
newsboys